Dunstan Weston Kamana (19 April 1937 – 13 September 2009) was a Zambian journalist, Permanent Representative of Zambia to the United Nations former ambassador to the United States ambassador to the Soviet Union and Zambia's High Commissioner to Canada. He had also served as the Presidential Press Secretary to Kenneth Kaunda.

Life and career 
Kamana was educated at St Mark’s College in Mapanza. In January 1965 he was appointed as Presidential Press Secretary, a post he held until July 1966 when he became Director of Information for the next two years. He later became first Zambian editor in chief of the Times of Zambia, serving as such until 1972 when he was appointed general manager of the Dairy Produce Board. Later that same year he was sent to Moscow as ambassador to the Soviet Union where he served for two years. He was then appointed as Zambia's High Commissioner to Canada from 1974 until 1976.

References

1937 births
Ambassadors of Zambia to the United States
Zambian diplomats
2009 deaths
Ambassadors of Zambia to the Soviet Union
High Commissioners of Zambia to Canada
Permanent Representatives of Zambia to the United Nations